Charles Ellsworth "Pee Wee" Russell (March 27, 1906 – February 15, 1969), was an American jazz musician. Early in his career he played clarinet and saxophones, but he eventually focused solely on clarinet.

With a highly individualistic and spontaneous clarinet style that "defied classification", Russell began his career playing traditional jazz, but throughout his career incorporated elements of newer developments such as swing, bebop and free jazz. Writing in 1961, the poet Philip Larkin commented: "No one familiar with the characteristic excitement of his solos, their lurid, snuffling, asthmatic voicelessness, notes leant on till they split, and sudden passionate intensities, could deny the uniqueness of his contribution to jazz."

Early life
Pee Wee Russell was born in Maplewood, Missouri, United States, and grew up in Muskogee, Oklahoma. As a child, he first studied violin, but "couldn't get along with it", then piano, disliking the scales and chord exercises, and then drums – including all the associated special effects. Then his father sneaked young Ellsworth into a dance at the local Elks Club to a four- or five-piece band led by New Orleans jazz clarinetist Alcide "Yellow" Nunez. Russell was amazed by Nunez's improvisations: "[He] played the melody, then got hot and played jazz. That was something. How did he know where he was or where he was going?" Pee Wee now decided that his primary instrument would be the clarinet, and the type of music he would play would be jazz. He approached the clarinettist in the pit band at the local theatre for lessons, and bought an Albert-system instrument. His teacher was named Charlie Merrill, and used to pop out for shots of corn whiskey during lessons.

His family moved to St. Louis, Missouri, in 1920, and that September Russell was enrolled in the Western Military Academy in Alton, Illinois. He remained enrolled there until October the following year, though he spent most of his time playing clarinet with various dance and jazz bands. He began touring professionally in 1922, and travelled widely with the Allen Brothers tent show and on riverboats St. Paul and J.S. He also played with a Charles Creath band at the Booker T. Washington Theater, a cultural epicenter for African Americans at the time. Russell's recording debut was in 1924 with Herb Berger's Band in St. Louis on "Fuzzy Wuzzy Bird.".

Career

From his earliest career, Russell's style was distinctive. The notes he played were somewhat unorthodox when compared to his contemporaries, and he was sometimes accused of playing out of tune. By the mid-1920s, Russell was a sought-after jazz clarinetist and worked with Jack Teagarden in pianist Peck Kelly's band in Texas. Back in St. Louis, Russell played with Frankie Trumbauer and Bix Beiderbecke at the Arcadia Ballroom, which had hired Trumbauer as bandleader for the season spanning September 1925 and May 1926. For a short while, Jack Teagarden also played at the Arcadia, and Russell claimed that this was the greatest band he had ever played in. In 1926, he joined Jean Goldkette's band, and the following year he left for New York City to join Red Nichols. While with Nichols's band, Russell did frequent freelance recording studio work, on clarinet, soprano, alto and tenor sax, and bass clarinet. In 1932 he recorded with the Rhythmakers in New York City. He worked with various bandleaders (including Louis Prima) before beginning a series of residences at the jazz club "Nick's" in Greenwich Village, Manhattan, in 1937.  He played with Bobby Hackett's big band, and began playing with Eddie Condon, with whom he would continue to work, off and on, for much of the rest of his life – though he complained, "Those guys [at Nick's and Condon's] made a joke, of me, a clown, and I let myself be treated that way because I was afraid. I didn't know where else to go, where to take refuge".

From the 1940s onwards, Russell's health was often poor, exacerbated by alcoholism – "I lived on brandy milkshakes and scrambled-egg sandwiches. And on whiskey ... I had to drink half a pint of whiskey in the morning before I could get out of bed" – which led to a major medical breakdown in 1951. He had periods when he could not play. Some people considered that his style was different after his breakdown: Larkin characterized it as "a hollow feathery tone framing phrases of an almost Chinese introspection with a tendency to inconclusive garrulity that would have been unheard of in the days when Pee Wee could pack more into a middle eight than any other thirties pick-up player".

During World War II, he recorded V-Disc sides with Muggsy Spanier and the V-Disc All Stars. His composition "Pee Wee Speaks" with Spanier was released as a V-Disc, as Navy V-Disc 135 and as Army V-Disc 344 in January, 1945.

He played with Art Hodes, Muggsy Spanier and occasionally bands under his own name in addition to Condon.  In his last decade, Russell often played at jazz festivals and international tours organized by George Wein, including an appearance with Thelonious Monk with an extended solo on Blue Monk at the 1963 Newport Jazz Festival, a meeting which has a mixed reputation (first available on the LP, Miles & Monk at Newport, and currently available as part of the Monk 2-CD set At Newport 1963–65). Russell formed a quartet with valve trombone player Marshall Brown, and included John Coltrane and Ornette Coleman tunes in his repertoire. Though often labeled a Dixieland musician by virtue of the company he kept, he tended to reject any label.   Russell's unique and sometimes derided approach was praised as ahead of its time, and cited by some as an early example of free jazz. At the time of their 1961 recording  Jazz Reunion (Candid), Coleman Hawkins (who had originally recorded with Russell in 1929 and considered him to be color-blind) observed that '"For thirty years, I’ve been listening to him play those funny notes. He used to think they were wrong, but they weren't. He’s always been way out, but they didn't have a name for it then." George Wein's Newport All-Stars album includes a slow blues called "Pee Wee Russell's Unique Sound".

By this time, encouraged by Mary, his wife, Russell had taken up painting abstract art as a hobby. Mary's death in the spring of 1967 had a severe effect on him.  His last gig was with Wein at the inaugural ball for President Richard Nixon on January 21, 1969. Russell died in a hospital in Alexandria, Virginia, less than three weeks later.

Awards and honors
In 1987, Pee Wee Russell was inducted into the Big Band and Jazz Hall of Fame.

Compositions
Pee Wee Russell wrote or co-wrote the following songs: "Pee Wee's Blues", "Pee Wee Speaks", "Oh! No", "Muskeegie Blues", "Three-Two-One Blues", "Stuyvesant Blues", "Pee Wee's Song", "The Bends Blues", "Midnight Blue", "Englewood", "Cutie Pie", "What's the Pitch", "Missy", "This Is It", "Pee Wee's Tune", and "But Why".

Discography

As leader/co-leader
1952: Clarinet Strut
1952: The Individualism of Pee Wee Russell (Savoy Jazz)
1952: Pee Wee Russell All Stars (Atlantic)
1953: Salute To Newport
1953: We're In the Money (Black Lion)
1955: Jazz at Storyville, Vol. 1 and 2 (Savoy) with Ruby Braff
1958: Portrait of Pee Wee (Counterpoint)
1958: Over the Rainbow (Xanadu)
1959: Pee Wee Russell Plays (Dot; reissued as Salute to Newport Impulse!, 1978)
1959: Newport Jazz Festival All Stars (Atlantic, 1959 [1960]) with George Wein, Buck Clayton, Bud Freeman, Vic Dickenson, Champ Jones and Jake Hanna
1960: Swingin' with Pee Wee (Swingville) with Buck Clayton; reissued as Prestige CD in 1999 under this title with Portrait of Pee Wee
1961: Jazz Reunion (Candid) with Coleman Hawkins
1962: New Groove (Columbia)
1964: Hot Licorice
1964: Gumbo
1965: Ask Me Now!  (Impulse!)
1966: The College Concert  (Impulse!)
1967: The Spirit of '67 with Oliver Nelson  (Impulse!)

As sideman
With Bix Beiderbecke
Bix Beiderbecke, Vol. 2: At The Jazz Band Ball 1927–1928 (Columbia, 1990)
With Ruby Braff
The Ruby Braff Octet with Pee Wee Russell & Bobby Henderson at Newport (Verve, 1957)
With Thelonious Monk
Miles & Monk at Newport (Columbia, 1963)
With Al Sears
Things Ain't What They Used to Be (Swingville, 1961) as part of the Prestige Swing Festival
With George Wein
George Wein & the Newport All-Stars (Impulse!, 1962)

Notes

References
 Balliett, Whitney, "Even his Feet Look Sad", New Yorker, August 11, 1962; reprinted in Balliett, American Musicians: Fifty-Six Portraits in Jazz (New York and Oxford: Oxford University Press, 1986), pp. 127–35 (also reprinted in Robert Gottlieb (ed.), Reading Jazz: A Gathering of Autobiography, Reportage and Criticism from 1919 to Now (New York: Pantheon, 1996), pp. 377–86)
Larkin, Philip, All What Jazz: A Record Diary (record reviews for the Daily Telegraph, 1961–71) (London: Faber, rev. edn 1985)
 Smith, Charles Edward, "Pee Wee Russell", in Nat Shapiro & Nat Hentoff (eds.), The Jazz Makers (London: Peter Davies, 1958), pp. 103–27
The standard discography is Robert Hilbert and David Niven, Pee Wee Speaks: A Discography of Pee Wee Russell, Studies in Jazz no. 13 (Metuchen, NJ: Scarecrow Press, 1992).

External links
[ All Music]
Charles "Pee Wee" Russell (1906-1969) Red Hot Jazz Archive

1906 births
1969 deaths
People from St. Louis County, Missouri
Dixieland clarinetists
Swing clarinetists
Mainstream jazz clarinetists
American jazz clarinetists
American jazz saxophonists
American male saxophonists
Musicians from St. Louis
People from Muskogee, Oklahoma
Savoy Records artists
Impulse! Records artists
Columbia Records artists
Xanadu Records artists
Atlantic Records artists
Candid Records artists
20th-century clarinetists
20th-century American saxophonists
Jazz musicians from Missouri
Jazz musicians from Oklahoma
20th-century American male musicians
American male jazz musicians
The Charleston Chasers members
McKenzie and Condon's Chicagoans members
Victor Recording Orchestra members